
Year 297 (CCXCVII) was a common year starting on Friday (link will display the full calendar) of the Julian calendar. At the time, it was known as the Year of the Consulship of Valerius and Valerius (or, less frequently, year 1050 Ab urbe condita). The denomination 297 for this year has been used since the early medieval period, when the Anno Domini calendar era became the prevalent method in Europe for naming years.

Events 
 By place 
 Roman Empire 
 Emperor Diocletian introduces an empire-wide taxation system based on census and indiction.
 Diocletian watches over the Syrian provinces while Caesar Galerius makes preparations for a campaign against the Persian king Narseh. He recruits veterans from  Illyria and Moesia, recruits new soldiers, and strengthens his army with Gothic mercenaries and the Armenian units of Tiridates III.
 August: Domitius Domitianus launches a usurpation against Diocletian in Egypt. He is perhaps aided by popular discontent with Diocletian's taxation reform. 
 Autumn: Diocletian besieges the rebels in Alexandria. 
 December: Domitianus dies, but his corrector Aurelius Achilleus takes over as the leader of the rebellion.
 Battle of Satala: Galerius launches a surprise attack against Narseh's camp in western Armenia. The Romans sack the camp and capture Narseh's wives, sisters and daughters, including his Queen of Queens Arsane. Narseh is wounded and escapes to his empire.

Births 
 Murong Huang, ruler of the Former Yan (d. 348)
 Yu Wenjun, empress of the Jin Dynasty (d. 328)

Deaths 
 Chen Shou, author of the San Guo Zhi (b. 233)
 Tirumalisai Alvar, one of the 12 Alvar saints. (b. 4203 BCE)
 Zhou Chu, Jin dynasty general, son of Zhou Fang (b. 236)

References